Ed Long may refer to:

Ed Long (aviator) (1915–1999), American pilot who holds the Guinness World Record for most flight hours at 65,000
Ed Long (audio engineer) (1932–2016), American inventor
Ed Long (cricketer) (1883–1947), Australian cricket player
Ed Long (politician) (1934–2017), American businessman and politician

See also
Edward Long (disambiguation)
Edwin Long (1829–1891), English painter